Vishal Singh Rathore is a professional polo  player from Rajasthan India, he is also known for his horse riding skills and polo pony training. He currently plays for Rajasthan Polo Club and has been the captain for the India national team 7 times. 

Rathore runs own polo club "Cavallo Riding and Polo club" in partnership with Sharvan singh. He also manages and trains polo ponies owned by over half of the official polo teams in India. Horses trained by him are said to out perform any other horses in competitive polo.

Vishal Singh Rathore is ranked the best polo player in India. He is the number one coach to polo players, polo horses and derby racing horses in India. He coached many players some famed ones of those are Ashok Chandna (sports minister Rajasthan), Sawai Padmanabh Singh from Jaipur erstwhile royal family, Ali brothers Hyderabad, Jodhpur polo team and more then 60 national and international players.

Vishal Singh Rathore as one of the youngest polo players represented his country as captain in world cup, he was awarded the Maharaja Sawai Man Singh Award in 2001. youth icon award by Amity college in 2007. He has played national polo matches representing India in countries like Argentina, England, America, UK, USA and Dubai.

References

Indian polo players
Polo players from Rajasthan
Living people
Year of birth missing (living people)